Heinrich Melzer (born 1873) was a German spiritualist medium.

History 
Melzer was born in Dresden, Germany. For thirty years he gave séances and claimed to have the ability to materialize stones and flowers. In the séance room he would only materialize the flowers under the table, and as the table was not checked skeptics accused him of simply hiding the flowers under the table before his séances. When the room was checked and scientific controls were introduced no flowers appeared. In 1926 Melzer was exposed as a fraud as he was caught with small stones attached to the back of his ears by flesh coloured tape.

References

1873 births
Year of death missing
German spiritualists
Spiritual mediums
People from Dresden